Harry 'Herb' Symonds (22 December 1880 – 15 May 1963) was an Australian rules footballer who played with Melbourne in the Victorian Football League (VFL).

Notes

External links 

1880 births
1963 deaths
Australian rules footballers from Victoria (Australia)
Melbourne Football Club players